The Minister for Housing, Local Government and Heritage is a senior minister in the Government of Ireland and leads the Department of Housing, Local Government and Heritage.

The current Minister for Housing, Local Government and Heritage is Darragh O'Brien, TD.

He is assisted by two Ministers of State:
Malcolm Noonan, TD – Minister of State for Heritage and Electoral Reform
Kieran O'Donnell, TD – Minister of State for Local Government and Planning

Overview
The minister is responsible for, among other matters:
housing;
local authorities and related services;
the supervision of elections, including general elections and presidential elections.

List of office-holders

Notes

References

External links
Department of Housing, Local Government and Heritage

Government ministers of the Republic of Ireland
Lists of government ministers of Ireland
Ireland, Housing, Local Government and Heritage
Minister
Housing ministers